Mark Jennings (born  in Namibia) is an English rugby union player, most recently playing with the Sale Sharks. He usually plays as a centre but can also play as a winger. He is the youngest player to have ever signed a professional contract for Sale Sharks, joining on his 16th birthday.  As of 5 February 2019, Mark Jennings and Sale Sharks agreed a mutual sabbatical away from Rugby Union. 3]

References

1993 births
Living people
English rugby union players
Rugby union centres
Sale Sharks players
Sedgley Park R.U.F.C. players
Rugby union players from Walvis Bay